Keshawn Charles Martin (born March 15, 1990) is a former American football wide receiver. He was drafted by the Houston Texans in the fourth round with the 121st overall pick of the 2012 NFL Draft. He played college football at Michigan State.

Professional career

Houston Texans
Martin was selected in the fourth round by the Houston Texans in the 2012 NFL Draft. After Trindon Holliday was cut from the Houston Texans, Martin took over the returning duties full-time. On November 18, 2013, Martin caught a 9-yard touchdown pass from Matt Schaub against the Jacksonville Jaguars for his first career touchdown. He also returned a punt 73 yards in the same game to set up another score.

New England Patriots
On September 16, 2015, Martin and a sixth-round 2016 draft pick were traded to the New England Patriots for a fifth-round pick. During the 2015 regular season, Martin played in 9 games and caught 24 passes for 269 yards and 2 touchdowns for the Patriots.

On January 16, 2016, the Patriots signed Martin to a two-year, $2.975 million extension.

On September 3, 2016, Martin was released by the Patriots as part of final roster cuts.

San Francisco 49ers
On September 27, 2016, the 49ers signed Martin to a two-year deal. He was released by the 49ers on November 8, 2016.

Detroit Lions
On March 11, 2017, Martin signed with the Detroit Lions. He was released by the team on August 28, 2017.

References

External links
Houston Texans bio
Michigan State Spartans bio
ESPN Statistics

1990 births
Living people
People from Inkster, Michigan
Players of American football from Michigan
American football wide receivers
Michigan State Spartans football players
Houston Texans players
New England Patriots players
San Francisco 49ers players
Detroit Lions players